Juan Ignacio Triviño Burgos (born September 3, 1980) is an Ecuadorian football defender. He is recently signed with El Nacional, and also played for the Ecuador national team between 2004 and 2005.

Playing style
Triviño is a tall, strong and precise center back with good heading and passing skills. Some managers have used him as a defensive midfielder rather than his natural position of center back.

Honors
Emelec
Serie A: 2001, 2002

External links

1980 births
Living people
Sportspeople from Guayaquil
Association football defenders
Ecuadorian footballers
Ecuador international footballers
C.S. Emelec footballers
S.D. Quito footballers
L.D.U. Portoviejo footballers
C.D. Universidad Católica del Ecuador footballers
C.D. El Nacional footballers